The Air Force Public Affairs Agency (AFPAA) is a United States Air Force field operating agency headquartered  at Joint Base San Antonio-Randolph, Texas. Headquarters AFPAA consists of two directorates, the Directorates of Staff and Operations. Additionally, AFPAA is accountable for two Combat Camera Squadrons, two Audiovisual Squadrons, and two Operating Locations. The Directorate of Staff includes Financial Management, IT Support, Knowledge Operations, Logistics, and Personnel and Training. The Directorate of Operations includes Branding, Trademark and Licensing, Public Web, Plans and Programs, and career field development courses writers.

The agency oversees the 1st Combat Camera Squadron and 4th Combat Camera Squadron co-located at Joint Base Charleston, South Carolina; the 3rd Audiovisual Squadron located at JB San Antonio-Lackland, Texas; and the Air Force's tier 1 video production facility, the 2d Audiovisual Squadron, located at Hill AFB, Utah.

The agency provides administrative and logistical support to six field offices across the United States. These include a command information branch at the Pentagon; Public Affairs assignment managers at the Air Force Personnel Center, JB San Antonio-Randolph, Texas; the Air Force Media Engagement Office in New York City; the Air Force Entertainment Liaison Office in Los Angeles; and the Combat Camera Detachment at Hurlbert AFB, Florida.

Combined, these offices and units encompass representatives from all specialties within the Public Affairs career field, and are charged with a multitude of unique public affairs responsibilities including: providing imagery documentation of Air Force warfighter and humanitarian relief missions; audiovisual production support; the public affairs visual information equipment purchasing program, the public web program, the branding and trademark licensing program, and serving as the Air Force's primary liaison to the Defense Media Activity on Defense Video and Imagery Distribution System and the American Forces Public Information Management System.  Additionally, AFPAA serves as the sole force provider for combat camera forces in the Air Force.  AFPAA also provides career-field support through the development of career development courses for the Air Force's nearly 5,500 public affairs practitioners.

Mission 
Provide Airmen with unique Public Affairs resources to document and convey the Air Force mission and legacy.

Vision 
Be the primary innovators of Public Affairs capabilities supporting global operations.

History 
AFPAA traces its roots to June 1, 1978, with the activation of the Air Force Service Information and News Center. AFSINC was redesignated as the Air Force News Center April 1, 1990, and became a field operating agency Feb. 5, 1991. It was redesignated to the Air Force News Agency Aug. 1, 1991, before its redesignation to AFPAA Oct. 1, 2008. AFPAA achieved full operational capability June 3, 2013.

Notes

References

 Air Force Historical Research Agency AFPAA Page

Public Affairs Agency
Military in Texas
Joint Base San Antonio
Public relations in the United States